The Apostolic Vicariate of Taytay is a Latin Catholic pre-diocesan missionary jurisdiction in the island of Palawan in the Philippines.

It is not a part of any ecclesiastical province as it is directly subject to the Holy See (under the jurisdiction of the Congregation for the Evangelization of Peoples), yet for the purpose of apostolic cooperation usually grouped with the Archdiocese of Manila, along with the Roman Catholic Apostolic Vicariate of Puerto Princesa. 

Its episcopal see is the Cathedral of Saint Joseph the Worker, in Taytay, Palawan.

History 
It was established on 27 March 2002 as the Apostolic Vicariate of Taytay when it split off from the Apostolic Vicariate of Palawan. The latter then became the Apostolic Vicariate of Puerto Princesa.

Apostolic Vicars of Taytay

See also 
 Catholic Church in the Philippines

References

External links 
 Claretian Publications; Apostolic Vicariate of Taytay
 GCatholic

2002 establishments in the Philippines
Apostolic vicariates
Roman Catholic dioceses in the Philippines
Religion in Palawan